The FACOM 128 was a relay-based electromechanical computer built by Fujitsu. Two models were made, namely the FACOM 128A, built in 1956, and the FACOM 128B, built in 1959. , a fully working FACOM 128B is still in working order, maintained by Fujitsu staff at a facility in Numazu in Shizuoka Prefecture.

The FACOM 128B processes numbers using a bi-quinary coded decimal representation.

See also 
 FACOM 100
 FACOM

References

External links 

Electro-mechanical computers
1950s computers